Savanna Portage State Park is a state park of Minnesota, USA, established in 1961 to preserve the historic Savanna Portage, a difficult  trail connecting the watersheds of the Mississippi River and Lake Superior. The portage trail crosses a drainage divide separating the West Savanna River, which drains to the Mississippi River and the Gulf of Mexico, from the East Savanna River, which flows in an opposite direction to the Saint Louis River, Lake Superior and the Great Lakes, and the Saint Lawrence River to the Atlantic Ocean.

Savanna Portage was a canoe portage used by Native Americans for centuries before being used by European explorers, fur traders, Voyageurs, coureurs des bois, and missionaries of the 18th and 19th centuries. It was a vital link connecting the Mississippi waterways to the west with the Great Lakes to the east. The portage was listed on the National Register of Historic Places in 1973 for having state-level significance in the themes of commerce, exploration/settlement, and transportation.

Geology and topography
The park is located on the divide between the watersheds of the Great Lakes and the Gulf of Mexico, both of which drain to the Atlantic Ocean.  The area is a low-relief plain which was once a glacial lakebed.  During the last phase of the Wisconsinan glaciation, the deteriorating continental glacier left behind connected lakes, known as Glacial Lakes Aitkin and Upham.  Formed by  the retreat of the Saint Louis Sublobe of the Superior Lobe of the glacier, Lake Upham drained through Lake Aitkin to the Mississippi River.  The retreating glacier and the lakes deposited sand and sediments in the lakebed.  As the lakes drained these sediments became the present plain.

The plain at first was drained by the Cloquet River, which then ran west to the Mississippi River.  By the process of stream piracy, the smaller Saint Louis River, which runs to Lake Superior, captured the Cloquet River and most of its drainage basin.  This left behind the East Savanna River which drains into the Saint Louis River, Lake Superior, the lower Great Lakes, and the Saint Lawrence River, and to the west, the West Savanna River, which is tributary to the Mississippi River.

The old lake plain is part of the Tamarack Lowlands Subsection within the Northern Minnesota Drift Plains Section of the Laurentian Mixed Forest.  Lacustrine sediments deposited by the glacial lake are parent to the present soils of peats, silt, and sand; the peats are in marshes which form large parts of the park.  These wet lowlands adjoin rolling hills which are end moraines of the recent glaciation.  The moraines are part of the Saint Louis Moraines Subdivision of the Northern Minnesota Drift Plain.

Savanna Portage
The plain in the old lakebed provided a low-grade but very swampy overland route across the divide between the East and West Savanna Rivers. As Wolf Lake and the upper East Savanna River are quite wet, the route selected for the portage trail departed from the river further downstream, shortening the distance to be traveled through the bog.

Long used by Native Americans, it became a thoroughfare between the Great Lakes and the Mississippi Valley for explorers, missionaries, and fur traders. Above Carlton travelers proceeded upstream through quieter stretches to the location of Floodwood, Minnesota, where they turned southwest up the sluggish East Savanna River in the bed of Glacial Lake Upham. Coming to a small rise, the travelers commenced the portage, which in its eastern reaches was marshy, mosquito-infested, and among the most unpleasant and even tortuous of all the routes taken by the voyageurs. Struggling waist-deep through the morass of the "boundless swamp", travelers eventually reached a hardwood forest, through which the trail ran to the West Savanna River, which drains to Big Sandy Lake and the Upper Mississippi River. In times of low water, the portage was drier but the river became too shallow for canoes, so voyageurs would continue to hike overland to the northeast bay of Big Sandy Lake.

The portage likely was used by Europeans as early as 1679, when Daniel Greysolon, Sieur du Lhut visited a Sioux village at Big Sandy Lake during his exploration of the Lake Superior region and the Upper Mississippi River. Among the portage's users were fur traders who operated in the upper Mississippi River valley. Some went no further than the American Fur Company's large regional trading post on Big Sandy Lake operated by William Aitkin in the 1820s and 1830s, the years of peak usage of the route. Explorers and scientists crossing the portage included David Thompson, British explorer of Canada and North West Fur Company cartographer, in 1798; Zebulon Pike, early explorer of the American west, in 1805; Lewis Cass, American general and explorer, in his unsuccessful 1820 search for the source of the Mississippi River; Henry Schoolcraft, geologist and explorer, who accompanied Cass in 1820 and led an expedition in 1832 to find the Mississippi River's source; Joseph Nicollet, French geographer and cartographer of the Upper Mississippi River, in 1836; and Laurence Oliphant, a British explorer and writer, in 1854. Tourists such as Count Ferdinand von Zeppelin, who crossed in 1863, also used the portage.

When the Northern Pacific Railroad, building west from Duluth, reached nearby McGregor in 1870, the portage fell out of use for through traffic, but continued to be used for local trade and access to the interior. The trail's location was traced and marked in 1926 and in the 1940s through the 1960s, and with the use of archaeological techniques, it was more precisely marked in 1981. Most of the route is now maintained as a hiking trail.

State park
The interest created by investigations into the trail's route inspired creation of Savanna Portage State Park in 1961. It is nearly surrounded by the Savanna State Forest.

 of hills, lakes, and bogs now comprise the park.  Activities include summer and winter camping, hiking, snowshoeing, and ski touring on the old portage and other trails, mountain biking, and snowmobiling, as well as swimming, fishing, canoeing, and boating on Loon Lake.

Flora and fauna
Named for its open marshy grassland, the park's peat bogs and marshes include sedges and black spruce, tamarack, and white cedar. Uplands host a mixed hardwood and conifer forest of maple, oak, poplar, birch, white pine, and red pine.

Land animals in the area include moose, black bears, deer, timber wolves, coyotes, skunks, amphibians, and wood turtles.  Birds include bald eagles, sharp-tailed grouse, warblers, boreal owls from Canada which winter in the area, sandhill cranes, trumpeter swans, and loons.

See also
 National Register of Historic Places listings in Aitkin County, Minnesota

References

External links

 Savanna Portage State Park

1961 establishments in Minnesota
Historic trails and roads in Minnesota
Portages on the National Register of Historic Places
National Register of Historic Places in Aitkin County, Minnesota
Native American history of Minnesota
Portages in the United States
Protected areas established in 1961
Protected areas of Aitkin County, Minnesota
Protected areas of St. Louis County, Minnesota
State parks of Minnesota
Transportation on the National Register of Historic Places in Minnesota
Transportation in Aitkin County, Minnesota